Samuel Ruddock (born 19 February 1990) is a Paralympic track cycling athlete who represented Great Britain in the F35 classification in the 100 metres and shot put events, for athletes with cerebral palsy. He is the British Record holder for the F35 Shot Put and the C1 Kilometere Time Trial, specialising in the track sprint events, preparing for his third Paralympic Games at Tokyo 2020.

Early years

Ruddock was born in Rugby, Warwickshire, diagnosed with cerebral palsy, a neuro-muscular condition caused by his premature birth. He attended Bishop Wulstan School to study at GCSE level, taking a profound interest in languages, history and politics. He found it difficult to play the predominant playground sport of football, due to a severe lack of lower body coordination. He however found great pleasure in basketball and cites films like Space Jam and Coach Carter as major influences on his extra-curricular ambitions in physical education. After completing his GCSEs, he took scholarship exams in 2006 and was subsequently offered a full academic scholarship to attend Rugby School to study English, History and Economics, as a day pupil in Town House.

Loughborough University

After completing his A-Levels, Ruddock chose to study International Relations at Loughborough University. He became immersed in the ethos of Loughborough  campus life and took up American football alongside his studies, playing linebacker for the Loughborough Aces, as the only player with a physical disability in the British University League. In late 2011, his final year of study, he was approached by an athletics coach during one of the football team's quarterly combine testing sessions. The coach, Joe McDonnell, spotted Ruddock's impairment and offered to coach him in disability sprinting, singling him out for his speed and power over short distances.

 Ruddock was quickly brought through the talent identification ranks by British Athletics and within months of training was awarded his senior international debut for the Great Britain Paralympic Athletics team that would compete in London, having attended his first official competition event in April 2012.

Post-University, Athletics and Cycling

Having graduated with First Class Honours, Ruddock is currently training for the 2020 Summer Paralympics in Tokyo and is employed as an Athlete Mentor for the Youth Sport Trust, working with secondary schools to encourage pupils, to use the values and lessons learnt through sport, to better their academic performance.

During the earlier part of the 2013-2014 athletics season, Sam made the transition to the field events to further his medal prospects at the 2016 Summer Paralympics and was selected to represent Great Britain in the shot put for the 2014 IPC Athletics European Championships in Swansea. After producing a new lifetime best at the 2015 World Championships and a silver medal performance at the following 2016 Europeans, Sam was selected to compete at the Rio 2016 Games, finishing 6th in the final. He is currently in training for the Tokyo 2020 Paralympic Games in track cycling, having joined the British Cycling Foundation Programme in 2019.

He is a big fan of the National Football League and WWE.

References

External links
 

Athletes (track and field) at the 2012 Summer Paralympics
Paralympic athletes of Great Britain
Alumni of Loughborough University
Cerebral Palsy category Paralympic competitors
1990 births
Living people
Sportspeople from Rugby, Warwickshire